Kelly Chaundel Tshibaka (born September 5, 1979) is an American attorney and politician who served in the federal government from 2002 to 2019 in several inspector general offices. Upon moving back to her home state of Alaska in 2019, she served for two years as the commissioner of the Alaska Department of Administration until 2021. Tshibaka was a Republican candidate for the United States Senate in the 2022 election.
She lost to the incumbent, Republican Lisa Murkowski.

Early life and education
Tshibaka was born in Alaska to Bill and Michele Hartline. Her father, a Vietnam veteran, worked as a union electrician, and her mother worked at Alaska's largest oil field, Prudhoe Bay. 
Tshibaka's parents once lived in a tent, which was not unusual for people who wanted to become oil workers, but by the time she was born they owned a house in Wasilla.

She was raised in Wasilla and Anchorage, graduating in 1995 from Steller Secondary School in Anchorage. She attended University of Alaska Anchorage and graduated from Texas A&M University in 1999.

Tshibaka earned a Juris Doctor degree from Harvard Law School in 2002. In 2001, while at Harvard, she wrote an article for the Harvard Law Record saying that "Unlike race or gender, homosexuality is a choice", but later apologized, said she had been assigned the article as a counterpoint piece, and added that "I don't hold that view today".

Tshibaka has said that she was the first in her family to graduate from college. At least one member of her extended family also attained a college degree, her maternal grandfather, the late Edward Allsup.

Career
Tshibaka worked for the federal government from 2002 to 2019, and for Alaska's state government from 2019 to 2021. Following her government work, she became a candidate for U.S. Senate.

Federal government work
From 2002 to 2005, Tshibaka served as a special assistant in the United States Department of Justice Office of the Inspector General. She then joined the Office of the Director of National Intelligence, serving as advisor to the inspector general of the intelligence community and senior advisor in the Civil Liberties and Privacy Office. A controversy arose as to whether or not she had improperly recorded about 600 working hours for which she was paid $36,000, but the matter was apparently closed in 2011 without any disciplinary action against her, and she says the accusation was retaliation for work she had done.

Tshibaka joined the Federal Trade Commission in 2013, serving as chief investigator and senior advisor to the inspector general until 2014. She then served as that Commission's acting inspector general from 2014 to 2015.

From 2015 to 2019, she served as assistant inspector general and chief data officer in the United States Postal Service Office of Inspector General. In that position, she relied heavily upon data analytics to monitor post offices, in order to reduce the time spent on audits and investigations, and to increase the return on investment in each of those cases.

State government work
In 2019, Alaska Governor Michael Dunleavy hired Tshibaka as a senior policy advisor, and the state paid her over $80,000 for the cost of moving her family from Washington D.C. Dunleavy then appointed Tshibaka commissioner of the Alaska Department of Administration in January 2019, after his first nominee to that position withdrew.

Among her responsibilities while commissioner was leading the state's negotiating team to end a strike by the Alaska ferry workers union. Tshibaka argued that higher wages translate into less money to run the system, and the union eased its stance on pay hikes, which helped to end the strike.

In 2021, a controversy arose about Nazi-themed license plates (e.g. "3REICH") that were found to be in use. Tshibaka ordered changes to her department's electronic screening system for personalized license plates, by adding such terms to the department's electronic screening list. She continued to serve as commissioner until stepping down in March 2021 to run for U.S. Senate.

Campaign for U.S. Senate

In Alaska's election for U.S. Senator, all candidates regardless of their political parties ran in a single Alaska primary in 2022, because of Alaska's new system of ranked choice voting. The top four candidates advanced to the general election, with Murkowski and Tshibaka in the lead. The Alaska Republican Party has endorsed Tshibaka, and one of the top four candidates (Buzz Kelley) withdrew and also endorsed Tshibaka, leaving the following three candidates: Murkowski, Tshibaka, and Pat Chesbro (Buzz Kelley remained on the ballot even though he withdrew). As of September 2022, Tshibaka and Murkowski were virtually tied in an AARP poll. According to a USA Today article about Tshibaka:
She is running because "it was the people of Alaska who stood up for me and gave me opportunities in life, and now I want to stand up for the people of Alaska," her campaign website reads. Tshibaka's site describes her as anti-abortion and pro-Second Amendment.

In August 2022, Tshibaka participated in a series of questions and answers with the Anchorage Daily News. Among other things, she said: "I will work to protect our jobs, build affordable housing, cut federal spending and taxes, and block those trying to shut down our resource industries....I will support nominees who advocate for parents' rights to be involved in their children's education, respect our 2nd Amendment and other constitutional rights, and recognize our rights to develop our land in ways that are environmentally responsible." She recognizes Joe Biden as president, and says that people who broke the law on January 6, 2021, at the U.S. Capitol "should be held responsible", but also believes that "legitimate questions about the 2020 election....deserve answers".

Tshibaka has sought to portray Murkowski as a liberal and "functionally a Democrat", in view of her vote in 2017 to preserve the Affordable Care Act, her decision not to support confirmation of Justice Brett Kavanaugh in 2018, and her support of various Biden nominees such as Justice Ketanji Brown Jackson and Interior Secretary Deb Haaland in 2021. Tshibaka concludes: "we don't feel like these votes and decisions represent us."

In addition to her candidacy being endorsed by Buzz Kelley and the Republican Party of Alaska, she was also endorsed by former President Donald Trump. Former Trump administration officials Bill Stepien, Justin R. Clark, and Tim Murtaugh worked on Tshibaka's U.S. Senate campaign.

Meanwhile, a super PAC called the "Senate Leadership Fund" associated with Kentucky's Republican U.S. Senator Mitch McConnell, spent $5.5 million running attack ads against Tshibaka. Alaska's Republican Party censured McConnell on October 23, 2022, for "directly contradicting" the party's July endorsement of Tshibaka by running advertisements that the party alleges are "divisive and misleading", "malicious", and a "gross distortion of fact". Those attack ads were also criticized by Factcheck.org.

Personal life
Tshibaka and her husband Niki, whom she met while she was in law school, have five children. In 2006, the couple founded a congregation associated with the Foursquare Church, an evangelical Pentecostal denomination. She is a member of the National Rifle Association. Tshibaka also has a membership in Safari Club International, an organization for hunters.

References

External links
Alaska U.S. Senate Debate on September 1, 2022 (YouTube video)
Alaska U.S. Senate Debate on October 10, 2022 (YouTube video)
Alaska U.S. Senate Debate on October 27, 2022 (YouTube Video)

1979 births
21st-century American women politicians
Alaska lawyers
Alaska Republicans
American women lawyers
Harvard Law School alumni
Lawyers from Anchorage, Alaska
Living people
Members of the Foursquare Church
People from Wasilla, Alaska
Politicians from Anchorage, Alaska
State cabinet secretaries of Alaska
Texas A&M University alumni
United States Inspectors General by name
Candidates in the 2022 United States Senate elections
21st-century American politicians